No Mercy is the second and final studio album by American hip hop group Blac Monks, which consisted of Houston-based rappers Mr. 3-2, D.A., Awol, Assata Tafari & Raheem. It was released on May 19, 1998 through Rap-A-Lot Records. The album peaked at number 74 on the US Billboard Top R&B/Hip-Hop Albums chart.

Track listing

Charts

References

External links 
 

1998 albums
Rap-A-Lot Records albums
Albums produced by Mike Dean (record producer)
Blac Monks albums